This article lists the discography of Russian-Ukrainian girl group Nu Virgos, known in Ukraine and other Russian-speaking countries as VIA Gra.

Albums

Studio albums

Compilation albums

Video albums

Singles

As lead artist

As a featured artist

Promotional singles

Music videos

Notes

References

Discography
Discographies of Ukrainian artists
Discographies of Russian artists
Pop music group discographies